Ilex caniensis is a species of plant in the family Aquifoliaceae. It is endemic to Peru. Some authorities have it as a synonym of Ilex uniflora.

References

Endemic flora of Peru
caniensis
Vulnerable plants
Taxonomy articles created by Polbot